Dungarpur State was a princely state during the British Raj. Its capital was the city of Dungarpur in the southernmost area of present-day Rajasthan State in India. In 1901 the total population of Dungarpur State was 100,103, while that of the town was 6094

Dungarpur is the seat of elder branch of Sisodiyas of Udaipur, while the younger branch is the seat of the Maharana of Mewar.

History
Dungarpur State was founded in 1197 by Samant Singh, the eldest son of the ruler of Mewar, Karan Singh. They are descendants of Bappa Rawal, eighth ruler of the Guhilot Dynasty and founder of the Mewar Dynasty (r. 734-753).
The chiefs of the state, who bear the title of Maharawal, are descended from Mahup, eldest son of Karan Singh, chief of Mewar in the 12th century, and claim the honours of the elder line of Mewar. Mahup, disinherited by his father, took refuge with his mother's family, the Chauhans of Bagar, and made himself master of that country at the expense of the Bhil chiefs, while his younger brother Rahup founded a separate Sisodia dynasty

The town of Dungarpur, the capital of the state, was founded in 1282 CE by his descendant Rawal Vir Singh, who named it after Dungaria, an independent Bhil chieftain whom he had caused to be assassinated. After the death of Rawal Udai Singh of Vagad at the Battle of Khanwa in 1527, where he fought alongside Rana Sanga against Babur, his territories were divided into the states of Dungarpur and Banswara. Udai's elder son Prithviraj succeeded his father as the rawal of Dungarpur and his younger son Jagmal became the first ruler of Banswara. Rawal Askaran accepted Mughal Suzerainty and became a vassal of Mughal Empire It remained successively under Mughal, Maratha, and British Raj control by treaty in 1818, where it remained 15-gun salute state The revenue of the state was Rs.2,00,000 in 1901.

List of Rulers

Maharawals
The Maharawals belonged to the Guhila dynasty, Ahra Guhilot clan
 1404: Pata
 1428: Gopinath (Gaipa Rawal) - He constructed Gaib Sagar Lake and Badal Mahal in Dungarpur.
 1469 – 1497: Somdas
 1497 – 1527: Udai Singh
 1527 – 1549: Prithviraj
 1549 – 1580: Askaran
 1580 – 1606: Sesmal
 1606 – 1609: Karam Singh II
 1609 – 1657: Punja Raj
 1657 – 1661: Girdhar Das
 1661 – 1691: Jaswant Singh
 1691 – 1702: Khuman Singh
 1702 – 1730: Ram Singh
 1730 – 1785: Shiv Singh
 1785 – 1790: Vairisal
 1790 – 1808: Fateh Singh
 1808 – 1844: Jaswant Singh II
 1844 – 1898: Udai Singh II (b. 1838 – d. 1898)
 13 Feb 1898 – 15 Nov 1918: Vijay Singh (b. 1887 – d. 1918)
 15 Nov 1918 – 15 Aug 1947: Lakshman Singh (b. 1908 – d. 1989)

The last princely ruler of Dungarpur was HH Rai-i-Rayan Maharawal Shri Lakshman Singh Bahadur (1918–1989), who was awarded KCSI (1935) and GCIE (1947), and after independence became a Member of the Rajya Sabha twice, in 1952 and 1958, and later a member of Rajasthan Legislative Assembly (MLA) in 1962 and 1989.

See also
List of Rajput dynasties and states
Mewar Residency
 Dungarpur district

References

External links

Princely states of Rajasthan
History of Rajasthan
12th-century establishments in India
1197 establishments in Asia
1947 disestablishments in India
Rajputs
Dungarpur district
Rajput princely states